Johnny McGrath (1931 – 5 June 2019) is a retired Irish sportsperson.  He played hurling with his local club Nenagh Éire Óg and was a member of the Tipperary senior inter-county team in the late 1950s. McGrath won a set of All-Ireland and Munster titles with Tipperary as a non-playing sub in 1958.

References

1931 births
2019 deaths
Nenagh Éire Óg hurlers
Tipperary inter-county hurlers